John Anderson (January 31, 1921 – August 18, 1974) was an American jazz trumpeter. Born in Birmingham, Alabama, he studied at the Los Angeles Conservatory of Music and the Westlake College of Music. He did a good deal of work in West Coast jazz with Stan Kenton and others. Anderson died in Birmingham in 1974.

Discography
With Count Basie
Everyday I Have the Blues (Roulette, 1959) - with Joe Williams
Dance Along with Basie (Roulette, 1959)
The Count Basie Story (Roulette, 1960)
With Buddy Collette
Tanganyika (Dig, 1956)
With Chico Hamilton
Chic Chic Chico (Impulse!, 1965)
With Stan Kenton
Stan Kenton's Milestones (Capitol, 1943-47 [1950])
Stan Kenton Classics (Capitol, 1944-47 [1952])
Artistry in Rhythm (Capitol, 1946)
Encores (Capitol, 1947)
A Presentation of Progressive Jazz (Capitol, 1947)
The Kenton Era (Capitol, 1940–54, [1955])
Two Much! (Capitol, 1960) with Ann Richards

References 

African-American jazz musicians
West Coast jazz trumpeters
1921 births
1974 deaths
20th-century American musicians
20th-century trumpeters
American jazz trumpeters
American male trumpeters
20th-century American male musicians
American male jazz musicians
20th-century African-American musicians
People from Birmingham, Alabama
Musicians from Birmingham, Alabama
Musicians from Alabama
Jazz musicians from Alabama